Knipp (in the Hanover area: Calenberger Pfannenschlag) is a type of sausage made by mixing meat with grains (Grützwurst) related to Pinkel which comes from the Bremen and Lower Saxony regions of Germany.

Knipp is made from oat groats, pork head, pork belly, pork rind, liver and broth and seasoned with salt, allspice and pepper. The smoked sausage is sold and consumed having been roasted, either just with bread, or with roast or boiled potatoes and gherkins, sweet and sour pumpkin, apple sauce (Apfelmus) and beetroot or even cold or hot on wholemeal bread. Sometimes crispy, fried slices of Beutelwurst are served with Knipp – this dish is known in Low Saxon as Knipp un Büddelwust.

In the Lüneburg Heath, Knipp is made with Heidschnucke meat and is known as Heidjer Knipp.

In Oldenburg, Knipp is called Hackgrütze.

For a long time, Knipp was considered to be a 'poor man's food', as it is made from offal and from butcher's scraps.

See also 
 Westfälische Rinderwurst
 Stippgrütze (similar dish as a Westphalian speciality)
 Goetta
 Scrapple
 List of smoked foods

References 

German sausages
North German cuisine
Smoked meat
Meat and grain sausages
Precooked sausages